Dušan Rupec (born 16 February 1968) is a retired Slovak football midfielder.

References

1968 births
Living people
Slovak footballers
FC Senec players
FK Inter Bratislava players
FK Drnovice players
MŠK Rimavská Sobota players
Association football midfielders
Slovak expatriate footballers
Expatriate footballers in the Czech Republic
Slovak expatriate sportspeople in the Czech Republic
Expatriate footballers in Austria
Slovak expatriate sportspeople in Austria
Czech First League players